Malcolm Gregory O'Connell  (19 March 1955 – April 2008) was a male British international swimmer. He competed in two events at the 1972 Summer Olympics.

He also represented England in the 100 metres breaststroke and the 4 x 100 metres medley relay, at the 1970 British Commonwealth Games in Edinburgh, Scotland. At the ASA National British Championships he won the 100 metres breaststroke title in 1971 and 1972 and the 200 metres breaststroke title in 1971.

References

External links
 

1955 births
2008 deaths
British male swimmers
Olympic swimmers of Great Britain
Swimmers at the 1972 Summer Olympics
Swimmers at the 1970 British Commonwealth Games
Commonwealth Games competitors for England